37th Brigade or 37th Infantry Brigade may refer to:

 37th Indian Brigade of the British Indian Army in the First World War
 37th Indian Infantry Brigade of the British Indian Army in the Second World War
 37th Infantry Brigade Combat Team (United States)
 37th Separate Airborne Brigade of the Soviet/Russian Airborne Troops
 37th Air Assault Brigade of the Kazakh Airmobile Forces

 United Kingdom
 37th Brigade (United Kingdom)
 Artillery Brigades
 37th (Howitzer) Brigade Royal Field Artillery

See also
 37th Division (disambiguation)
 37th Regiment (disambiguation)
 37th Squadron (disambiguation)